Bob Haas (born c. 1930) is a retired Canadian football player who played for the Winnipeg Blue Bombers. He played college football at the University of Tulsa.

References

Living people
1929 births
Players of American football from Dayton, Ohio
Players of Canadian football from Dayton, Ohio
American football centers
Canadian football offensive linemen
American players of Canadian football
Tulsa Golden Hurricane football players
Winnipeg Blue Bombers players